Ananya Sritam Nanda known as Ananya Nanda is an Indian playback singer from Bhubaneswar, Odisha, India. She was the winner of Indian Idol Junior Season 2.

Early life
Ananya's father, Prasanna Kumar Nanda, is a director in a government industrial department and her mother, Prasanti Mishra, is a housewife. Ananya considers her elder sister Amrita Pritam Nanda, as her inspiration. Ananya who has been training in singing under Hindustani exponents Guru Pandit Dr. Chitta Ranjan Pani and Guru Nilamani Ojha. She started her study from DAV Public School, Pokhariput, Bhubaneswar. She completed her 12th grade at Kiit International School, Bhubaneswar where she became her school's topper. Now she is studying in Mumbai.

Career
Ananya won the Season 2 of Indian Idol Junior in 2015. During competing in Indian Idol Junior she got a two-year record deal with Universal Music India. After winning Indian Idol Junior, she released her debut album 'Mausam Mastana' under the Universal Music label. The song was originally sang by veteran playback singer Asha Bhosle from the 1982 movie Satte Pe Satta. The additional music and lyrics were composed and written by DJ AKS. She started as a Bollywood playback singer in film ‘M.S. Dhoni: The Untold Story’ for the music director Amaal Mallik.
She is also regular playback singer for Ollywood Industry, has sung in many films like ‘Agastya’, Baby (2016 film), Kathadeli Matha Chuin. When she won the competition received calls to visit Narendra Modi, Prime Minister of India  and Naveen Patnaik, Chief minister of Odisha. In 2019, she participated in Colors TV reality show Rising Star where she was in Top 5.

Discography

References

External links
  on Odia.TV
 
  on Gaana
  on Hungama

Year of birth missing (living people)
Living people
Artists from Bhubaneswar
Bollywood playback singers
Indian Idol winners
Indian women playback singers
21st-century Indian singers
Singers from Odisha
Women musicians from Odisha
21st-century Indian women singers
Odia playback singers